The Pinkertons is a Canadian Western police procedural television series which features crime cases of the Pinkerton detective agency. The show is officially licensed with the Pinkerton detective agency, and features stories based on actual cases from the Pinkerton detective agency archives dating to the 1860s.

The program is produced by Rosetta Media and Buffalo Gal Pictures, in partnership with Channel Zero.  Production of this first-run syndicated television show was announced in April 2014, and filming began the following August.

Cast

Main
 Martha MacIsaac, as Kate Warne, a Pinkerton agent and the first female detective in US history.
 Jacob Blair, as William Pinkerton, the founder's son and also, a Pinkerton agent.

Recurring 

 Angus Macfadyen as Allan Pinkerton, the founder of the detective agency.
 Jennifer Pudavick as Annalee Webb, proprietor of the Dubois Hotel and Saloon.
 David Brown as Sheriff Lawrence Logan.
 Ray Strachan as John Bell, caretaker of the farm where Kate's rented house is located
 Dean Fujioka as Kenji Harada, originally a client, and later an apprentice Pinkerton agent.

Episodes

Broadcast
In the United States, the series was distributed by Rohrs Media Group. The 22-episode first season was made available on Netflix in November 2016 (September in the UK).

The program made its Canadian debut on January 27, 2015 on CHCH, an independent television station owned by Channel Zero.

The series premiered on UKTV's Drama channel in the United Kingdom and Ireland on 30 August 2015.

Awards and nominations

References

External links
 The Pinkertons on Drama
 
 
 The Pinkertons on Netflix
 
 
 The Pinkertons on YouTube

2010s Canadian drama television series
2014 Canadian television series debuts
2015 Canadian television series endings
First-run syndicated television programs in the United States
English-language television shows
Television shows filmed in Manitoba
2010s Western (genre) television series
Cultural depictions of Allan Pinkerton